The U.S. Government Accounting Office Building is an historic government office building, the headquarters of the Government Accountability Office. It is located at 441 G Street NW in Washington, D.C., adjacent to the National Building Museum. Building also serves as headquarters for U.S. Army Corps of Engineers.

It was dedicated on September 11, 1951, by President Harry S. Truman.

See also
National Register of Historic Places listings in central Washington, D.C.

References

External links
 

General Accounting Office Building
Government buildings completed in 1951
Government buildings on the National Register of Historic Places in Washington, D.C.
Judiciary Square
Office buildings in Washington, D.C.
Office buildings on the National Register of Historic Places in Washington, D.C.